The 1988 Houston Oilers season was the franchise's 19th season in the National Football League and the 29th overall. The franchise scored 424 points, which was second in the AFC and second overall in the NFL. The defense gave up 365 points. Their record of 10 wins and 6 losses resulted in a third-place finish in the AFC Central Division. The Oilers appeared once on Monday Night Football and appeared in the playoffs for the second consecutive year. Warren Moon would be selected for the Pro Bowl. In the playoffs, they defeated the Cleveland Browns 24-23 in the Wild Card game. However, in the divisional playoffs, they lost 17-10 to the Bills.

Offseason

NFL draft

Personnel

Staff

Roster

Regular season

Schedule 

Note: Intra-division opponents are in bold text.

Season summary

Week 1

The game started at 4:00 PM on Sunday, September 4, 1988, in Hoosier Dome.

First Quarter:
Touchdown, Gary Hogeboom to Matt Bouza, 23 yard pass (Indianapolis Colts).
Touchdown, Steve Brown, 44 yard interception return (Houston Oilers).

Second Quarter:
Touchdown, Albert Bentley, 1 yard rush (Indianapolis Colts).
Touchdown, Mike Rozier, 1 yard rush (Houston Oilers).

Third Quarter:
No points scored.

Fourth Quarter:
No points scored.

Overtime:
Field Goal, Tony Zendejas, 35 yard kick (Houston Oilers).

The game ended in overtime at 17-14, with the Houston Oilers on top.

Week 2

The game started at 4:00 PM on Sunday, September 11, 1988. The game was played at the Houston Astrodome. In the first quarter, Marcus Allen of the Raiders rushed one yard for a touchdown. That same quarter, Allen Pinkett of the Oilers rushed three yards for a touchdown. In the second quarter, Willie Gault of the Raiders received a 42-yard pass from Steve Beuerlein for a touchdown. In that quarter, Tim Brown of the Raiders also received a 4-yard pass from Steve Beuerlein for another touchdown. Allen Pinkett of the Oilers rushed for a one-yard touchdown in the same quarter, Steve Smith of the Raiders received a 9-yard pass from Steve Beuerlein in the same quarter, Drew Hill received a 16-yard pass from Cody Carlson of the Oilers for the fifth touchdown in that quarter between both teams. In the third quarter, Tony Zendejas kicked a 19-yard field goal for the Oilers. In the fourth quarter, Ernest Givins of the Oilers received a 12-yard touchdown pass from Cody Carlson. Also in that quarter, Marcus Allen of the Raiders rushed one yard for a touchdown. Allen Pinkett of the Oilers brought back the lead on that quarter, rushing 6 yards for a touchdown. Eventually, the game ended 38-35 with the Oilers on top, resulting in a win.

Week 3

The game started at 1:00 PM on Sunday, September 18, 1988. The game was played at Giants Stadium. In the first quarter, Tony Zendejas of the Oilers kicked a 30-yard field goal, scoring the only points of the game for the Oilers. Kurt Sohn of the New York Jets received a 8-yard pass from Ken O'Brien for a touchdown in the same quarter. Also in the first quarter, Freeman McNeil of the New York Jets rushed 8 yards for a touchdown. Ken O'Brien, with the distances being 4-yards and 50-yards. In the third quarter, Pat Leahy of the Jets kicked a 47-yard field goal. In the fourth quarter, Wesley Walker received a 23-yard pass from Pat Ryan, resulting in a touchdown. Also in that quarter, Mike Zordich of the Jets intercepted a pass, and ran 35 yards for a touchdown. The final score was 45-3, with the New York Jets on top. This game was a loss for the Oilers.

Week 4

Week 5

Week 6

Week 7

Week 8

Week 9

Week 10

Week 11

Week 12

Week 13

Week 14

Week 15

Week 16

Standings

Playoffs

AFC Wild Card

AFC Divisional

Awards and records 
 Warren Moon, Pro Bowl
 Warren Moon, All-Pro selection

Milestones 
 Drew Hill, 3rd 1,000 Yard Receiving Season (1,141)

References

External links 
 1988 Houston Oilers at Pro-Football-Reference.com

Houston Oilers
Houston Oilers seasons
Houston
1988 in Houston